Bunnanadden, Bunnanaddan or Bunninadden is a small village in south County Sligo, Ireland. It is on the R296 road, 9 km from Tubbercurry and 8 km from Ballymote.

The village contains the parish church (The Sacred Heart of Mary), two pubs, a national school and sports hall. It formerly had two shops and a post office, the last of which closed in early 2011.

The village is in the parish of Bunnanadden with a second church in Killavil.

The local football club is Bunninadden GAA, founded in 1886, which also includes the parishes of Doocastle and Killavil.

Landmarks 

 Sonny McDonagh Memorial, an Irish Flute player in the South Sligo style, 1926–1991.

Notable people 
John Scanlon, Wisconsin farmer/legislator

References

Electrification of Bunninadden, 1955

Towns and villages in County Sligo